Despina Montagas (born June 9, 1961) is a retired Greek female professional wrestler.

Professional wrestling career
Despina Montagas debuted in 1984 for the American Wrestling Association in Minneapolis. She would also wrestle for various territories including Florida (Championship Wrestling from Florida), Mid-Atlantic (Jim Crockett Promotions), Memphis (Continental Wrestling Association), and New York (World Wrestling Federation). She also went overseas to Japan to wrestle for All Japan Women's Pro Wrestling. In 1986, she had a brief stint in the Gulf Coast for Continental Championship Wrestling. She also had a stint in Mexico for the Universal Wrestling Association.

In 1989, she returned to Japan to wrestle for Frontier Martial-Arts Wrestling. In October 1990, she took part in the country's first mixed tag team match. In March 1991, she left the promotion and retired shortly thereafter.

Personal life
Montagas was married to Tarzan Goto, and the couple have three sons. A year after beginning to wrestle, Montagas quit and sold life insurance, but returned to wrestling shortly afterwards. Goto died on May 29, 2022 from liver cancer.

References

1961 births
Living people
Sportspeople from Athens
Greek female professional wrestlers
20th-century professional wrestlers